Grov is a small village in the municipality of Kinn in Vestland county, Norway. Grov lies along the Eikefjorden at the junction of the highways Rv.5 and Fv.614, just a couple kilometres south of the Norddalsfjord Bridge. The Tonheim-Grov area had 100 inhabitants in 2001.

References

Villages in Vestland
Kinn